The Moine Supergroup is a sequence of Neoproterozoic metamorphic rocks that form the dominant outcrop of the Scottish Highlands between the Moine Thrust Belt to the northwest and the Great Glen Fault to the southeast. The sequence is metasedimentary in nature and was metamorphosed and deformed in a series of tectonic events during the Late Proterozoic and Early Paleozoic. It takes its name from A' Mhòine, a peat bog in northern Sutherland.

Distribution
The main outcrop of the Moine series lies northwest of the Great Glen Fault, structurally above the Moine Thrust to the west forming what is known as the Northern Highlands Terrane. A smaller area of similar rocks that are correlated with these, outcrop within the 'Grampian Terrane' to the southeast of the Great Glen. Moinian rocks are also recognised on Mull, Orkney and Shetland.

Stratigraphy
The Moine Supergroup has been subdivided into different groups or divisions. The relationship between individual groups in terms of age and stratigraphic equivalence is generally unclear, as they are unfossiliferous due to their age and metamorphic state.  They are mostly described in tectonostratigraphic terms referring to their position relative to major Caledonian thrust structures. The Moine is lithologically monotonous, being dominated by psammites (metamorphosed sandstones), making lithostratigraphic correlation extremely difficult.

Morar Group

This group lies tectonically above the Moine Thrust but below the Sgurr Beag or Naver thrusts. Large slices of Lewisian-type gneisses occur within this group, locally a basal conglomerate is preserved, confirming the unconformable nature of the contact between them.

East Sutherland Moine
This group lies tectonically above the Naver Thrust. The upper boundary of this group is not seen.

Glenfinnan Group

This group lies tectonically above the Sgurr Beag Thrust and below the Loch Eil Group. There is evidence of a true stratigraphic transition between these two groups in some areas. Slices of Lewisian-type gneisses are found above the Sgurr Beag thrust and are interpreted to represent pieces of basement to the group incorporated during the Caledonian orogeny.

Loch Eil Group
This group lies above the Glenfinnan Group. The upper boundary of this group is not seen. Towards the southwestern end of its outcrop the Group consists of widespread psammites within which are identified a lower Kinlocheil Quartzite Formation which is anything up to 1.5 km in thickness, an overlying Glen Gour Quartzite and Pelite Formation of 500-800m thickness and above this, the 100-650m thick Stronchreggan Formation. A Tarvie Psammite Formation is recorded in the Strathconon and Strathglass districts.

Dava and Glen Banchor successions
These sequences lie within the Grampian Terrane and are classed as subgroups within a newly established Badenoch Group. They have been tentatively correlated with the Moine, which they resemble lithologically and with which they share a metamorphic history. These successions may have a basement-cover relationship with the Grampian Group, the lowermost part of a younger metamorphic sequence, the Dalradian Supergroup.

Age

Age of sedimentation
The complete lack of fossils is consistent with a Precambrian age for the sequence. This is also shown by the age of the earliest known intrusions that cut the sequence, dated at around 870 Ma. There is also no evidence of the sequence being affected by the 1300-1000 Ma Grenville orogeny. This together suggests an early Neoproterozoic sedimentation age. A possible correlation with the lithologically similar Torridon Group, an unmetamorphosed sequence of similar age found beneath the Moine Thrust, remains unproven.

Age of metamorphism

Knoydartian
Radiometric dating of micas from deformed pegmatites provided the first evidence of a Precambrian metamorphic event with ages of 690-750 Ma. With improved techniques, the timing of this event has been constrained to ca. 820-790 Ma, with later ages relating to cooling.

Caledonian
It was originally thought that the Highland and Grampian terranes had distinct geological histories as it appeared that only the latter had been affected by the Ordovician age Grampian metamorphic event. Although it is now known that Moine was also affected by the Grampian event, the dominant metamorphic event is of late Silurian age, associated with the Scandian orogeny.

Structure

Pre-Knoydartian
Despite the degree of both metamorphism and deformation in the Moine sequence, it has been possible to identify variations in the original depositional thickness of the various groups. These thickness variations have been interpreted in terms of half-grabens within an overall rift setting.

Knoydartian
The cause of the Knoydartian metamorphic event has yet to be established. Some authors interpret this to be a result of a high heatflow due to extensional tectonics, while others interpret it to be an orogenic event.

Caledonian
The main tectonic event recorded in the Moine rocks is the Late Silurian Scandian event. The main structures formed are regionally significant thrusts, the Moine Thrust, the Naver Thrust and the Sgurr Beag Thrust. The thrusts that lie structurally above the Moine Thrust Zone have all been folded and deformed in a ductile fashion.

The final stages of the Caledonian orogeny involved sinistral strike-slip faulting. The Great Glen Fault is the largest of the structures formed at this time, but other major faults occur within the Moine outcrop including the Strathconon and Strathglass faults.

Igneous rocks

Basic intrusions
The Moine sequence is cut by numerous small metabasic intrusions, particularly in the Glenfinnan and Loch Eil groups. They have a tholeiitic chemistry, consistent with intrusion into a rift setting.

Early granitic intrusions
The Moinian rocks of Ross-shire and Sutherland are intruded by a distinctive set of granitic sheets, which give latest Proterozoic intrusion ages in the range 611-588 Ma. It has been suggested that these granites formed associated with rifting.

'Newer' granites
The main suite of granites intruded into the Moine are the Late Silurian to Early Devonian age 'newer granites' that occur throughout the Scottish Caledonides.

References

External links 

Stratigraphy of Scotland
Geological supergroups
Neoproterozoic Europe
Geography of Highland (council area)